Guzmania besseae is a plant species in the genus Guzmania. This species is native to Bolivia and Ecuador.

References

besseae
Flora of Bolivia